Calosoma denticolle is a species of ground beetle in the subfamily of Carabinae. It was described by Gebler in 1833.

References

denticolle
Beetles described in 1833